Myanmar is a sovereign state in South East Asia bordered by Bangladesh, India, China, Laos and Thailand. Myanmar is a country rich in jade and gems, oil, natural gas and other mineral resources. In 2013, its GDP (nominal) stood at US$56.7 billion and its GDP (PPP) at US$221.5 billion. The income gap in Myanmar is among the widest in the world, as a large proportion of the economy is controlled by supporters of the former military government.

Notable firms 
This list includes notable companies with primary headquarters located in the country. The industry and sector follow the Industry Classification Benchmark taxonomy. Organizations which have ceased operations are included and noted as defunct.

See also 
 List of airlines of Myanmar
 List of banks in Myanmar

References 

Myanmar